Morris Markin (July 15, 1893 – July 8, 1970) was a Russian-born American businessman who founded the Checker Cab Manufacturing Company (which would later become the Checker Motors Corporation).

Early years

Born in to a Jewish family in Smolensk, a city in western Russia, Morris Markin worked in a clothing factory during his young years. His determination and hard work got him promoted to a supervisor position by the age of nineteen, when he emigrated to the United States in November 1912. When he arrived at Ellis Island, he spoke no English and couldn't afford to pay the bond required to enter the country. A janitor at the facility loaned him the twenty-five dollars he needed for the bond.

From New York City, Markin went to Chicago to live with his uncle. He held several jobs as an errand boy, the last for a tailor who taught him the trade. When the tailor died, Markin purchased the business on credit from the widow. He worked hard and saved enough money to bring seven brothers and two sisters to the States. Markin then teamed up with one of the brothers and opened a factory which made pants under government contracts during World War I. This company prospered after the war.

Formation of Checker Cab

In 1921, Markin entered the automobile business when he collected an auto body manufacturing company from an engineer named Lomberg. Markin had loaned fifteen-thousand-dollars to Lomberg earlier in an effort to keep the company afloat. When it failed, Lomberg returned to Markin to ask for more money. Markin refused and took over the company for his debt. He then picked up a failed automobile manufacturer, Commonwealth Motors, and with it the accountant, Ralph E. Oakland. Then, in a bold move, Markin purchased the defunct Handley-Knight chassis plant and the Dort body plant in Kalamazoo, Michigan. He moved his entire operation to Kalamazoo and on February 2, 1922 formed the Checker Cab Manufacturing Company.

In 1929, he purchased the Yellow Cab Company from John Hertz.

References

External links
Internet Checker Taxicab Archive

1893 births
1970 deaths
American people of Russian-Jewish descent
American founders of automobile manufacturers
Businesspeople from Chicago
People from Smolensk
Emigrants from the Russian Empire to the United States
Russian Jews
Yellow Cab Company
20th-century American businesspeople